The FN Model 30-11 is a Belgian bolt-action sniper rifle, manufactured between 1976 and 1986.

Derived from the FN Model 30, based on the Mauser action dating to the G98, with three-piece bolt and a five-round magazine. The trigger and stock are both adjustable, the stock by means of butt spacers. The furniture is wood. The rifle features a flash hider, as well as a standard rear-folding bipod (same as the FN MAG). The standard sights are micrometer-adjustable iron, but the usual fitting is an Anschütz four-power  telescope; a nightscope can be fitted, if desired.

No longer manufactured by FN, the Model 30-11 remains in service with Belgian police and military, as well as military forces in several countries.

Developing the Model 30-11 
When developing the Model 30–11, FN focused on achieving high levels of accuracy with a system that was easily adjustable for the individual shooter. In comparison, the Steyr SSG gave the appearance of a glorified sporting rifle, while the FR-Fl did encompass some of the features FN deemed important most notably the free floating barrel and the concept of keeping the bipod detached from the barrel. FN set out to create a rifle that would address some of the shortcomings of the existing designs, specifically by incorporating the following features
 Nato standard 7.62x51mm caliber,
 improved accuracy with a free—floating heavy barrel,
 an adjustable heavy and wide bipod for stability,
 removable optics with a mechanism that will hold zero,
 Offer optics, night vision capability, and target / training sights,
 operator specific adjustments including adjustable comb and adjustable stock length with the use of spacers,
 and optional rifle configuration with removable magazine.

Action / Bolt / Barrel /Stock  
FN distinguished their rifle with stability which was achieved by the heavy barrel and wide bipod. FN borrowed parts from other product lines but this should not be confused with assembling a rifle from a parts bin. Parts were specifically finished, altered, or made for the FN 30-11 sniper rifle. The smooth action (receiver, bolt, and safety) originated from the Supreme line, the barrel originated from a MAG-58 barrel blank and was finished by Canons Delcour an FN supplier of high quality barrels. The flashhider was sourced from the MAG-58 line and the MAG-58 bipod was modified to fit the UIT rail, also known as Anschutz rail.

Rifles were finished in FN's black enamel paint and originate from de model 30. Early bolts were left in the white, but this was changed within a few years with blued bolt handles, bolt sleeves, and cocking pieces.

The custom walnut stock was made by FN. At the time all sniper rifle stocks were made out of walnut. The use of walnut on the FN 30-11 did not have adverse effects on accuracy as the rifle has a free floating barrel.

Scope and sights 
Anschutz is a leader in manufacturing competition target and biathlon rifles and accessories. FN purchased their accessories which were known for quality and accuracy. The UIT mounting rail for the bipod and sling were manufactured by Anschutz, a standardized size at the time (long before picatinny rails became standard). The removable front and rear sight came directly from Anschutz' competition line. These sights were meant for training the operators. This system has remained almost unchanged for decades and is still used in biathlon shooting.

The FN designed scope mount utilized the STANAG NATO Standardization Agreement) scope mounting system. The mount was an innovative approach to holding zero when removing and reinstalling a scope. FN offered the rifle with a 4x24mm scope sourced from Karl Kaps in Germany. For unknown reasons FN had switched from the excellent OIP (Optique et Instruments de Precision — Optical and Precision Instruments) scopes to selling the German made scope. OIP had supplied FN for years and their period 3.6x scope was actually brighter. The Karl Kaps scope was known in Germany as the Z24 (Zielfernrohr 24 — rifle scope 24mm) and was also made by Hensoldt. The Z24 scope was used with G3 rifles. It is likely that FN hoped to generate sales in West Germany for the 30-11 rifle equipped with familiar German accessories and optics.

An optional night vision scope was available. Requests for options in optics introduced a mount with standard rings for more powerful / alternate scopes in 1985. The FN 30-11 was used with the following scopes; some sourced directly from the commercial market:

 original FN, Kaps manufactured, scope
 Kahles 6x42mm scope
 Swarovski 6x42mm scope (may be limited to Dutch use)
 Hensoldt 6x42mm scope
 Carl Kaps 3-12x56mm scope
 Leupold 6.5-20x40 scope
 some Hensoldt Z24 Model 2 scopes with illuminator were also used as a later replacement option

Bipod 
Initial the 30-11 was introduced with MAG-58 style bipod, later this evolved to BREN style bipod.

Introduction 
The rifle was introduced in 1975. FN's marketing was predominantly geared towards law enforcement but the Model 30-11 was also shown to military customers. It was mainly marketed by FN's Departement Police (department for police). English language marketing materials named the system "the untangling machine". A subtle reference to the mess hostage situations created, such as the Munich Massacre.

Unlike standard FN Mauser contracts, the Model 30-11 was not built to order. FN kept an amount of rifles and parts in stock due to the specialized features and components sourced from contractors. FN purchased quite a few parts and accessories from vendors including the US. Model 1907 pattern sling, the German built 4x24mm scope, the night vision scope, the Anschutz target sights and UIT rail system with removable sling swivel, and the travel case, which was sourced from US. suppliers. Customers had the option of purchasing the rifle with an internal 5-round magazine or removable 10-round magazine. The 10—round magazine was a modified FN FAL magazine that fit in a special trigger—guard. The removable 30-11 magazines did not function with the FAL rifle. The rifles were given serial numbers and not contract numbers. FN offered the entire system as a package. A customer had the option to buy the entire package or select specific components.

Users
 Unknown quantity used by Argentine Air Force snipers with a 6X scope.
 64 rifles were purchased in three different configuration from 1975 through 1981
 A small quantity was purchased directly from FN and / or H&K, which sold Dutch surplus rifles.
 25
 25
 Unknown quantity
 34 were ordered in 1983 and used with Swarovski 6X42mm optics. A second order consisted of 66 rifles, 65 were without scopes. Dutch officials were dissatisfied with the performance of the Swarovski scope they selected. There were further concerns about accuracy with standard 7.62mm ammo. This was quickly remedied by using FN Match ammunition. Instead of investing in other optics, Dutch officials opted to replace the FN 30–11 with the H&K PSGl after its introduction in 1985. The 34 FN 30-11 rifles that had been fielded were traded to H&K for the acquisition of the PSGl. The rifles from the second order were sold as surplus, 63 of those were still new in factory wrapping.
 Less than 10 rifles ordered.
 Unknown, a quantity of 170 rifles was reported in 1984.

FN never sold the model to West Germany. The rifles and parts on the German commercial market originated from The Netherlands or surplus disposition after the model was discontinued. .

Reportedly 51 new rifles were imported into the United States for commercial sales. An east coast surplus dealer also imported dozens of surplus rifles; these were reported to be Chilean contract rifles, although no information on a Chilean contract was located. These rifles show significant wear after years of use. Other US. parts dealers have sold
surplus FN parts, most notably the special stock.

References

FN Mauser Rifles Arming Belgium and the World, by Anthony van der Linden

External links
World Guns
FN company website

7.62×51mm NATO rifles
Sniper rifles of Belgium
Rifles of the Cold War
Bolt-action rifles of Belgium
Model 30-11